The University of Sassari (UniSS) is a university located in Sassari, Italy. It was founded in 1562 and is organized in 13 departments.

The University of Sassari earned first place in the rankings for the best “medium-sized” Italian university, in 2009–2010, by the Censis Research Institute, but in 2012 it fell to the 6th position among the best Italian universities.

History and profile

The University of Sassari was founded by Alessio Fontana, member of Imperial Chancellery of Emperor Charles V and a distinguished gentleman in the town of Sassari in 1558. The official opening dates back to the month of May 1562. It was first run by the Jesuits.

Today, the University, which is of medium size, with a total number of over 18.000 students and about 700 teachers, comprises eleven faculties and over 40 departments, study centres and institutes. There are several specialist schools, research institutions, schools for special research and postgraduate schools.

Corporate relations 
One of the oldest universities in Italy, Sassari is now developing one of the modern network of corporate opportunities for its students and recently collaborated internationally with TreeAndHumanKnot a giving first ideology of RisingIndia ThinkTank to have students of the university an international experience.

Organization
These are the 11 faculties in which the university is divided into:
 Faculty of Agriculture
 Faculty of Architecture
 Faculty of Arts
 Faculty of Economics and Business 
 Faculty of Foreign Languages and Literature
 Faculty of Law
 Faculty of Mathematical, Physical and Natural Sciences
 Faculty of Medicine and Surgery
 Faculty of Political Science
 Faculty of Pharmacy
 Faculty of Veterinary Medicine

According to the National Law 240/2010, the Departments substituted for the Faculties from January 2012.

There are 10 Departments at the University of Sassari:

 Agraria (Agriculture)
 Architettura, design e urbanistica (Architecture, Design and City Planning)
 Chimica e farmacia (Chemistry and Pharmacy)
 Giurisprudenza (Law)
 Medicina veterinaria (Veterinary Medicine)
 Scienze biomediche (Biomedical Sciences)
 Scienze economiche e aziendali (Economic and Business Sciences)
 Scienze mediche, chirurgiche e sperimentali (Medical, Surgical, Experimental Sciences) 
 Scienze umanistiche e sociali (Humanistic and Social Sciences)
 Storia, scienze dell'uomo e della formazione (History, Human Sciences, Education)

Points of interest
 Orto Botanico dell'Università di Sassari, the university's botanical garden

Notable alumnus
 Adelasia Cocco – possibly the first female doctor in Italy

See also
 List of early modern universities in Europe
 List of Italian universities
 List of Jesuit sites
 Sassari

References

External links
 University of Sassari Website

University of Sassari
University of Sassari
1562 establishments in the Kingdom of Sardinia
Educational institutions established in the 1560s
Buildings and structures in Sardinia
Education in Sardinia